The Beatrice Municipal Auditorium is a historic two-story building in Beatrice, Nebraska. It was built in 1940 as part of the New Deal's Public Works Administration, and designed in the Art Deco style by architect Fred Organ. It has been listed on the National Register of Historic Places since November 16, 2005.

References

National Register of Historic Places in Gage County, Nebraska
Art Deco architecture in Nebraska
Buildings and structures completed in 1940
1940 establishments in Nebraska